Aberdeen High School is a public high school in Aberdeen, Maryland, United States. It is a part of the Harford County Public Schools.

Test performance
Aberdeen High School's performance on the Maryland High School Assessment test is close to equivalent to the state average.  In algebra, the average proficiency was 3.1 out of five, the same as the average in the state.  In English, the average proficiency was 2.9 out of five, while the state's average proficiency was 3.0.

Science and Mathematics Academy
The Science and Mathematics Academy (SMA) is a magnet program located at Aberdeen High School in Aberdeen, Maryland available to Harford County residents entering high school. It was founded in 2004 by its first coordinator Donna Clem and in association with Dennis Kirkwood.  The school is an active member of the National Consortium for Specialized Secondary Schools of Mathematics, Science and Technology and part of Harford County Public Schools.

School information
"The program provides students with opportunities to experience coursework in science, mathematics, and technology while emphasizing research applications. Regular communication with practicing scientists and mathematicians is a cornerstone of the program and seniors complete capstone projects.  Throughout these projects they perform research under mentors who are professionals in their fields."

Classes and programs
Within the SMA schedule, many honors classes are integrated.  AP classes are also strongly encouraged.  Electives in the SMA add to the program's uniqueness.  Electives are based on interest and may not be available every year.

The SMA has a unique class called Science Research and Technology (SRT) that SMA students are required to take each of four years at the SMA.  The first three years of the SRT curriculum teach students about various academic fields and prepare them for their fourth and final year of SRT, in which they complete capstone projects. Students are paired with professionals in their fields of choice to mentor them for their projects. Seniors have two one-and-a-half-hour-long periods every other school day to complete their projects, which they present at the end of the year.  They make posters to present their projects to the students, teachers, family, and professionals that come to the gallery walk that is held near the end of the school year. Throughout the process they have to perform research, write papers, and present their projects multiple times.  All qualified Aberdeen High students can take part in the SMA Electives listed in the previous paragraph, but only SMA students can take SRT.

Clubs and organizations

Academic Team
Chess club
Envirothon
FIRST Robotics Competition – Team 1980
French National Honor Society
Genders and Sexualities Alliance
German Club
Green Team
International Thespian Society
Latino Dancers
Leo Club
Marquee Drama Club
Mu Alpha Theta
National Honor Society
Science National Honor Society
Spanish Club
Spanish National Honor Society
Students Against Destructive Decisions
Tri-M Music Honor Society
Ultimate Frisbee
Future Educators Association
Student Government Association
HCRASC Membership School
Aberdeen Eagles Esports
Key Club
Women in STEM Club

Notable alumni
Frank Eugene Corder (did not graduate), flew plane into south lawn of White House
 J. Wilmer Cronin (1896–1982), state politician and publisher of The Harford Democrat
Dondre Gilliam, NFL wide receiver for the San Diego Chargers
David Grace (basketball) UCLA and Oregon State University basketball coach.
Michael D. Griffin, physicist, former Administrator of NASA
E. J. Henderson, NFL linebacker for the Minnesota Vikings
Erin Henderson, NFL linebacker for the New York Jets
Brionna Jones, professional basketball player
Barbara Osborn Kreamer, Maryland politician
Jai Lewis, professional basketball player
Jon Harlan Livezey (born 1938), Maryland delegate
Gary Neal, professional basketball player
Irv Pankey, NFL lineman for the Los Angeles Rams and Indianapolis Colts
Julie Peterson, model, Playboy Playmate of the Month (February 1987)
Billy Ripken, former Baltimore Orioles second baseman
Cal Ripken Jr., former Baltimore Orioles shortstop, Major League Baseball Hall of Fame member
Cal Ripken, Sr., former Major League Baseball coach for the Baltimore Orioles
Harold J. Ross, fine art photographer
Devon Saddler, professional basketball player in Italy, Greece, Hungary, Belarus and Israel

References

External links

 Aberdeen High School
 Hartford County Public Schools system page
 Aberdeen HS Profile
 Aberdeen High School Team 1980 First Robotics Website
 Official Science and Math Academy Website
 SMA Contact Information

Harford County Public Schools
Public high schools in Maryland
Educational institutions established in 1907
Magnet schools in Maryland
Aberdeen, Maryland
1907 establishments in Maryland